Mehmedović is a Bosnian surname meaning "son of Mehmed". Notable people with the surname include:

Ersin Mehmedović (born 1981), Serbian footballer
Damir Mehmedovic (born 1997), Austrian footballer
Hatidža Mehmedović (1952-2018), Bosnian human rights activist
Majda Mehmedović (born 1990), Montenegrin handball player
Sasha Mehmedovic (born 1985), Canadian judoka
Zehrudin Mehmedović (born 1998), Serbian footballer

Bosnian surnames
Patronymic surnames
Surnames from given names